Lesnoy is a rural locality (a selo) in Kelermesskoye Rural Settlement of Giaginsky District, Adygea, Russia. The population was 171 as of 2018. There are 4 streets.

Geography 
Lesnoy is located 17 km southeast of Giaginskaya (the district's administrative centre) by road. Kelermesskaya is the nearest rural locality.

References 

Rural localities in Giaginsky District